GSJ may refer to:

 Gamelan Sekar Jaya, an American gamelan ensemble
 Girl Scouts of Jamaica (G.S.J.)
 Girl Scouts of Japan
 Grade separated junction, a type of road interchange
 Grossmann Jet Service (ICAO: GSJ), Prague, Czech Republic